The Cosmic Award is given annually at the Hollandse Nieuwe theater festival in Amsterdam to the best Dutch artist of non-Dutch descent.

Winners
Najib Amhali
Jörgen Rayman
Jetty Mathurin
Kenneth Herdigein (2005)

References

Dutch awards